Jordan Lake is lake on the northern edge of Duchesne County, Utah, United States.

The lake is located in the Naturalist Basin, at the eastern foot of Mount Agassiz, within the High Uintas Wilderness in the Uinta-Wasatch-Cache National Forest. The lake was named for David Starr Jordan, a noted biologist, authority on fish, and a student of Louis Agassiz (for whom the nearby mountain was named).

See also

 List of lakes in Utah

References

Lakes of Utah
Features of the Uinta Mountains
Lakes of Duchesne County, Utah
Wasatch-Cache National Forest